The  is a river in Shizuoka Prefecture and Kanagawa Prefecture Japan. In Shizuoka Prefecture it is called the Ayuzawa River. It flows into the Pacific Ocean.

References

Rivers of Kanagawa Prefecture
Rivers of Shizuoka Prefecture
Rivers of Japan